Mónica Bertolino (born July 12, 1957) is an Argentinean architect. As an entrepreneur in the field of music, she owns and operates Estudio Bertolino-Barrado, a recording studio with several locations in Argentina, including Córdoba, Santa Fe, San Juan, Jujuy, as well as a studio located in Spain. The studio obtained the Diploma to the Merit - Architecture 2002-2006 in Visual Arts in the Konex Awards 2012.

Biography 
Mónica Bertolino was born in Córdoba, Argentina. Her father was an architect. She entered the Faculty of Architecture and Urbanism of the National University of Córdoba during the last year of the Taller Total, graduating in 1981.

At Miguel Ángel Roca's studio, she met Carlos Barrado, her life and work companion. In partnership with him, she has created single-family and collective dwellings, commercial premises, and institutional buildings. She has participated in numerous competitions.

Awards and recognition 

 2002: Vitruvio Award of the MNBA
 2002: Honorable Mention in the Bienal Panamericana de Quito with the Jardín botánico de la municipalidad de Córdoba
 2008: Mention in the CPAU
 2010: Prize in the Bienal Iberoamericana de Arquitectura y Urbanismo Panorama de Obras for the Farm at Capilla del Monte (BIAU)
 2010: Nominated for the Marcus Prize in Milwaukee
 2011: 3rd prize in the ARQ Clarín Awards for the urban project Pasarela Las Varillas and Honorable Mention for the works Casas Múltiples and Casa en Potrero de Garay
 2012: Diploma to the Merit - Architecture 2002-2006 in Visual Arts in the Konex Awards.

Bibliography
 Adria, Miquel. New Latin American Landscape Arquitecture, 2009. . Nasisbooks
 Montaner, Josep Maria. Arquitectura y crítica en Latinoamérica. Nobukosa, 2011
Gómez Luque, Mariano. Doce arquitectos contemporáneos. Nobukosa, 2011

References 

 

20th-century Argentine architects
Argentine women architects
National University of Córdoba alumni
Academic staff of the National University of Córdoba
1957 births
People from Córdoba, Argentina
Living people